CapFriendly is a Canadian hockey website that specializes in the business aspect of the National Hockey League (NHL). The site contains the contract information of NHL players and coaches in a salary cap database, as well as explanations on specific aspects of the NHL collective bargaining agreement. CapFriendly was launched in May 2015 following the closure of the website CapGeek. The current site is the result of a merger with HockeysCap. It is run by co-partners Jamie Davis and Dominik, the respective founders of HockeysCap and CapFriendly. The website began as an amateur effort and is not affiliated with the NHL, but it became known for accurate and up-to-date information with fans and several hockey journalists regularly referencing its data and armchair general manager capability. In 2015, The Hockey Writers announced an exclusive partnership with CapFriendly.

References

Ice hockey websites
Canadian sport websites
Internet properties established in 2015